Brian Hollamon is an American college baseball coach and former shortstop, who is the current head baseball coach of the Maryland Eastern Shore Hawks.

Playing career
Hollamon attended Sussex Central High School in Georgetown, Delaware. Hollamon then enrolled at Salisbury University, to play college baseball for the Salisbury Sea Gulls baseball team. As a sophomore in 1993, Hollamon was named the Sea Gulls team MVP at the conclusion of the season.

Coaching career
Hollamon became a graduate assistant at the University of Maryland Eastern Shore in the fall of 1995. Hollamon stayed on board with the Hawks through the 1999 season. Hollamon was named the head coach Mardela High School in Mardela Springs, Maryland in 1999. In 2003, Hollamon left Mardela to take the head coaching position at Parkside High School in Salisbury, Maryland. Hollamon spent 14 season as the head coach of Parkside, helping several players earn NCAA Division I scholarships.

On August 21, 2017, Hollamon was named the head coach at Maryland Eastern Shore.

Head coaching record

See also
 List of current NCAA Division I baseball coaches

References

External links
Brian Hollamon, Head Baseball Coach Maryland Eastern Shore Hawks

Living people
Baseball shortstops
Salisbury Sea Gulls baseball players
Maryland Eastern Shore Hawks baseball coaches
High school baseball coaches in the United States
Year of birth missing (living people)